Paimon is a spirit named in early grimoires. These include The Lesser Key of Solomon (in the Ars Goetia), Johann Weyer's Pseudomonarchia Daemonum, Collin de Plancy's Dictionnaire Infernal, the Livre des Esperitz (as "Poymon"), the Liber Officiorum Spirituum (as Paimon), The Book of Abramelin, and certain French editions of The Grimoire of Pope Honorius (as Bayemon); as well as British Library, Sloane MS 3824.

Status and rank
The Goetia and Weyer begin entries on King Paimon noting that he is quite obedient to Lucifer.

King Paimo(n) appears as the ninth spirit in the Ars Goetia, the 22nd spirit in the Pseudomonarchia Daemonum, and in the Dictionnaire Infernal. In the Liber Officiorum Spirituum, he is first listed as the sixth spirit and later as the third king.

The Goetia, Weyer, de Plancy, Livre des Esperitz, Liber Officiorum Spirituum, and Sloane MS 3824 all rank Paimon as a king. The Livre des Espiritz, Sloane MS 3824, and the Grimoire of Pope Honorius specify that King Paimon is king of the west. In the Book of Abramelin (where his appearance is given no description), he is instead one of the eight dukes.

Relationship to hierarchy
The Goetia, Weyer, and de Plancy warn that if King Paimon appears alone, a sacrifice must be made to summon Lebal (sometimes called Bebal), the most devoted to Lucifer, and Abalam, two kings who serve under him but do not always accompany him. These three sources state that he rules 200 legions of spirits, some of which are of the order of Angels and the rest Powers. The Livre des Esperitz, on the other hand, credits him with just 25 legions of spirits. Sloane MS 3824 mentions him as employing a "bishop" named Sperion, among other spirits.

Critical editions of the Lesser Key of Solomon list him as a former Dominion. Weyer notes a confusion over whether he was a former Dominion or Cherub. According to Thomas Rudd, King Paimon is opposed by the Shemhamphorasch angel Haziel.

Appearance 
In the Goetia, Weyer, de Plancy, Livre des Esperitz, Liber Officiorum Spirituum,  he is described as a man riding a Dromedary camel, preceded by men playing loud music (particularly trumpets), as well as cymbals. Sloane MS 3824 describes the camel as crowned, while the rest describe King Paimon himself as crowned. The Goetia itself makes no mention of King Paimon's face, while the rest describe him as having a beautiful face but still refer to him as male.

Possession 
Sloane MS 3824 and the Liber Officiorum Spirituum describe him as having a "Hoarse Voice", and those works, Weyer, and the Goetia note that he must be commanded to speak plainly, with the Liber Officiorum Spirituum specifying that King Paimon will speak in his native language until commanded to converse in the summoner's own language.

Powers 
The Goetia, Weyer, Livre des Esperitz, and the Liber Officiorum Spirituum all describe him as teaching science and answering other questions. The Goetia and Weyer specify that his knowledge includes all arts and "secret Things" , such as knowledge regarding the Earth, its waters, and the winds. The Livre des Esperitz and the Liber Officiorum Spirituum broaden this to truthfully answering all questions asked of him, with the former source also claiming that he can reveal hidden treasures and the latter highlighting that he knows all the affairs of the world. The Goetia, Weyer, and the Livre des Esperitz also claim he has the ability to bestow dignities and lordships.  The Goetia and Weyer credited him with granting familiars (who are likewise good at teaching). The Liber Officiorum Spirituum uniquely gives him command over fish. Sloane MS 3824 mentions Paimon in "An Experiment to Cause a Thief to Return".

In Abramelin, King Paimo(n)'s powers include knowledge of past and future events, clearing up doubts, making spirits appear, creating visions, acquiring and dismissing servant spirits, reanimating the dead for several years, flight, remaining underwater indefinitely, and general abilities to "make all kinds of things" (and) "all sorts of people and armor appear" at the behest of the magician.

In popular culture 
 Paimon appears as a djinn in the manga and anime series Magi: The Labyrinth of Magic.
 Paimon appears as the unseen main antagonist of the film Hereditary.
 Paimon appears as the shapeshifting father of Stolas in the YouTube web series Helluva Boss.
 A female Paimon appears in the manga and anime Welcome to Demon School! Iruma-kun. She is a demon hero of the 13 crowns known as the lord of fairies.
 Paimon appears as a Boss in Infernax.
 Paimon's servant Abalam is claimed to be the alleged demon in The Last Exorcism.
 An unrelated Paimon appears as a character in Genshin Impact. Appearing as a small, floating, fairy-like girl, she is described as the main character's "emergency food", leading them around the world of Teyvat.

References

Bibliography 

Goetic demons
Male horror film villains